Jack Brady (17 December 1996) is an Irish professional footballer who plays as a goalkeeper for League of Ireland First Division team Longford Town.

Early life
Brady was born in Dublin on 17 December 1996. Brady was educated at St Anne's Community College in Killaloe.

Club career
Brady spent his youth years at Dublin clubs St. Kevin's Boys, and Shelbourne F.C. He started to appear on the bench frequently during the 2015 season and made his debut in a 2–0 home win against Cobh Ramblers. He went on to make 20 appearances for the club.
 
In 2017 Longford Town signed Brady until the end of the season. While there he made seven league appearances, and was usually used as a substitute. 
In 2018 Brady moved back south and signed for Limerick F.C. While there he was a regular starter and made 30 league appearances before the clubs liquidation. 
In 2020 Brady returned to Shelbourne.
Brady signed for new Limerick club Treaty United in 2021 before departing at the end of the 2022 season to return to Longford Town.

References

1996 births
Living people
Republic of Ireland association footballers
Association football goalkeepers
League of Ireland players
Shelbourne F.C. players
Treaty United F.C. players